Wilson Kipsang Kiprotich (born 15 March 1982) is a Kenyan professional athlete who specialises in long-distance running, competing in events ranging from 10 km to the marathon. He was the bronze medallist in the marathon at the 2012 Summer Olympics. He is the former world record holder in the marathon with a time of 2:03:23, which he set at the 2013 Berlin Marathon.  He has run under 2 hours 4 minutes for the marathon on four occasions.

Kipsang is a double winner of the Frankfurt Marathon (2010 and 2011) and has also won the London Marathon twice (2012 and 2014), New York Marathon (2014), and Tokyo Marathon (2017).  His best time over the half marathon distance is 58:59.

Career 
A native of Keiyo District in Kenya, Kipsang began competitive running for Kenya Police, and finished second in the 10 kilometre Tegla Loroupe Peace Race. He became a professional international athlete in 2007 and that year he took second place at the Tilburg Ten Miles, recording a time of 46:27, and he won a road race in Hem (his time of 27:51 was the fourth fastest in a 10 km race that year). He also took third place at the Kenyan Police Force championships, finishing behind Richard Mateelong.

2008
At the World's Best 10K, he finished third with a time of 28:09 behind Deriba Merga and Silas Kipruto.

He returned to the Tilburg Ten Miles race in 2008, and again finished as runner-up – just two seconds behind winner Abiyote Guta. His peak of the year was in a half marathon race: the Delhi Half Marathon. Kipsang pushed Merga, the 2006 World Road Running Champion, right up to the line but finished one second behind him. Despite the second-place finish, Kipsang improved his best by over one minute to 59:16. His time was also the third fastest half marathon by any runner that year, with Merga and Haile Gebrselassie ahead of him by just one second each.

2009
Kipsang started 2009 strongly, winning the Egmond Half Marathon in chilly conditions. Another good performance followed when he took second at the Ras Al Khaimah Half Marathon – his time of 58:59 made him only the fourth runner to have run below 59 minutes. At his second World's Best 10K he finished third, repeating his feat from the previous year. Despite being the favourite for the 2009 Berlin Half Marathon, he ended up in third place in a fast race which was the first occasion in which all the top-four runners finished under an hour.

He competed in the World 10K Bangalore in May 2009, and finished fourth. He competed in his first IAAF World Half Marathon Championships at the end of that year, taking fourth place with a time of 1:00:08.

2010
In April 2010 he made his marathon debut in the Paris Marathon, and finished third in a time of 2:07:13 hours, half a minute behind winner Tadesse Tola. He won the Frankfurt Marathon in October in a new course record of 2:04:57, this time beating Tadesse by over a minute. The time made him the eighth fastest marathoner ever.

2011
He won his third marathon at the 2011 Lake Biwa Marathon, defeating Deriba Merga to win in a course record of 2:06:13. He returned to defend his title at the Frankfurt Marathon and set about attacking Patrick Makau's five-week-old world record.

Kipsang came within four seconds of the time, crossing the line after 2:03:42, and ended the race with the second fastest marathon time ever.

2012
Kipsang began 2012 with a third-place finish at the RAK Half Marathon. He won the London Marathon in April in 2:04:44, just 4 seconds short of the course record set the previous year by Emmanuel Mutai. Starting as favourite he went on to win the bronze medal in the men's marathon at the London 2012 Olympic games. One month after the Olympics, he travelled to Newcastle to win the Great North Run in 59:06. That December he won the Honolulu Marathon.

2013
He opened bethropolis 2013 by continuing his winning line, taking the title at the New York Half Marathon. He was among the favourites for the 2013 London Marathon, but he managed only fifth place, timing 2:07:47 for the distance. He stepped down to the 10K for the Great Manchester Run and although he beat Haile Gebrselassie, he was runner-up by one second to Moses Kipsiro. He performed less well at the Bogotá Half Marathon, taking fifth place with 1:05:26 hours. On 29 September he won the Berlin Marathon, beating second place finisher Eliud Kipchoge by over 30 seconds  and setting a new world record of 2:03:23, 15 seconds faster than the previous record by Patrick Makau.

2014–2017
On 13 April 2014, Kipsang won the 2014 London Marathon in a course record time of 2 hours, 4 minutes and 29 seconds.

On 2 November 2014, Kipsang won the New York City Marathon in 2:10:59 in his first appearance.

At the 2016 BMW Berlin marathon, Kipsang ran the joint fourth-fastest marathon time ever, 2:03:13, which was good enough for second place behind winner Kenenisa Bekele in 2:03:03.

At 2017 Tokyo Marathon Kipsang ran CR with 2:03:58. After being forced to step out at BMW Berlin marathon at 30 km mark, Kipsang achieved 2nd place at the New York City Marathon in 2:10:56.

2018

After his success at the 2017 Tokyo Marathon, Wilson Kipsang returned to Japan's capital, with ambitions to reclaim the world record (WR) that he has lost to compatriot Dennis Kimetto. In the press conference, he quoted 2:02:50, as his target time. However, the world record was not to be his, as Kipsang was forced to drop out after just 15 km, with stomach problems. The former world record holder said, "I really wanted to go fast, but after suffering from stomach problems the last two days before the race, I didn't have the power to run a decent race today."

Wilson returned to Berlin in September to attempt to break the marathon world record. In the pre-race press conference, Wilson revealed that he would run a negative split, with 61:30 as his target time for the half-way point. On the race day, Wilson was unable to maintain the requested pace and ended up finishing 3rd, behind Amos Kipruto and Eliud Kipchoge, who did set a new marathon record, with the time of 2:01:39.

Provisional suspension and four year ban
On 10 January 2020 Kipsang was provisionally suspended for Whereabouts Failures and Tampering or Attempted Tampering of samples by the Athletics Integrity Unit.

World Athletics said between April 2018 and May 2019 the 38-year-old Kenyan, twice a London Marathon winner, had missed four "whereabouts appointments".

In June 2020 Kipsang was banned for four years for doping offences.  He had additionally tried to maintain that the missed testing appointment was due to a car accident, but it was established that the accident took place three months after the missed appointment.

Achievements

International competition record

Road running

World Marathon Majors results timeline

Personal bests
Source – .

References

External links

1982 births
Living people
People from Elgeyo-Marakwet County
Kenyan male long-distance runners
Kenyan male marathon runners
Athletes (track and field) at the 2012 Summer Olympics
Olympic athletes of Kenya
Olympic bronze medalists for Kenya
Medalists at the 2012 Summer Olympics
World record setters in athletics (track and field)
Berlin Marathon male winners
World Athletics Championships athletes for Kenya
Frankfurt Marathon male winners
London Marathon male winners
New York City Marathon male winners
Olympic bronze medalists in athletics (track and field)
Tokyo Marathon male winners
Recipients of the Association of International Marathons and Distance Races Best Marathon Runner Award